Fatou Subdistrict is a subdistrict on the southern part of Chaoyang District, Beijing, China. It borders Wangsiying Township to the north, Dougezhuang Township to the east, Shibalidian Township to the south, and Nanmofang Township to the northwest. As of 2020, it has a total population of 78,952.

The subdistrict was named after Fatou Village in the area, which in turn was named so its glutinous and heavy soil during planting season. Fatou Village first appeared on record in 1593.

History

Administrative Division 
In 2021, there are a total of 16 communities under Fatou Subdistrict:

References 

Chaoyang District, Beijing
Subdistricts of Beijing